Xaspoladoba (also, Khaspoladoba and Khaspolatoba) is a village and municipality in the Khachmaz District of Azerbaijan.  It has a population of 1,837.  The municipality consists of the villages of Khaspoladoba, Babali, Azizli, and Ganjali.

References 

Populated places in Khachmaz District